is a Japanese Nippon Professional Baseball player for the Yomiuri Giants in Japan's Central League.

External links

Living people
1984 births
Baseball people from Hiroshima Prefecture
Japanese baseball players
Nippon Professional Baseball outfielders
Yomiuri Giants players